In mathematics, a Banach bundle is a vector bundle each of whose fibres is a Banach space, i.e. a complete normed vector space, possibly of infinite dimension.

Definition of a Banach bundle

Let M be a Banach manifold of class Cp with p ≥ 0, called the base space; let E be a topological space, called the total space; let π : E → M be a surjective continuous map. Suppose that for each point x ∈ M, the fibre Ex = π−1(x) has been given the structure of a Banach space. Let

be an open cover of M. Suppose also that for each i ∈ I, there is a Banach space Xi and a map τi

such that

 the map τi is a homeomorphism commuting with the projection onto Ui, i.e. the following diagram commutes:

 and for each x ∈ Ui the induced map τix on the fibre Ex

 is an invertible continuous linear map, i.e. an isomorphism in the category of topological vector spaces;

 if Ui and Uj are two members of the open cover, then the map

 is a morphism (a differentiable map of class Cp), where Lin(X; Y) denotes the space of all continuous linear maps from a topological vector space X to another topological vector space Y.

The collection {(Ui, τi)|i∈I} is called a trivialising covering for π : E → M, and the maps τi are called trivialising maps. Two trivialising coverings are said to be equivalent if their union again satisfies the two conditions above. An equivalence class of such trivialising coverings is said to determine the structure of a Banach bundle on π : E → M.

If all the spaces Xi are isomorphic as topological vector spaces, then they can be assumed all to be equal to the same space X. In this case, π : E → M is said to be a Banach bundle with fibre X. If M is a connected space then this is necessarily the case, since the set of points x ∈ M for which there is a trivialising map

for a given space X is both open and closed.

In the finite-dimensional case, the second condition above is implied by the first.

Examples of Banach bundles

 If V is any Banach space, the tangent space TxV to V at any point x ∈ V is isomorphic in an obvious way to V itself. The tangent bundle TV of V is then a Banach bundle with the usual projection

 This bundle is "trivial" in the sense that TV admits a globally defined trivialising map: the identity function

 If M is any Banach manifold, the tangent bundle TM of M forms a Banach bundle with respect to the usual projection, but it may not be trivial.
 Similarly, the cotangent bundle T*M, whose fibre over a point x ∈ M is the topological dual space to the tangent space at x:

 also forms a Banach bundle with respect to the usual projection onto M.

 There is a connection between Bochner spaces and Banach bundles. Consider, for example, the Bochner space X = L²([0, T]; H1(Ω)), which might arise as a useful object when studying the heat equation on a domain Ω. One might seek solutions σ ∈ X to the heat equation; for each time t, σ(t) is a function in the Sobolev space H1(Ω). One could also think of Y = [0, T] × H1(Ω), which as a Cartesian product also has the structure of a Banach bundle over the manifold [0, T] with fibre H1(Ω), in which case elements/solutions σ ∈ X are cross sections of the bundle Y of some specified regularity (L², in fact). If the differential geometry of the problem in question is particularly relevant, the Banach bundle point of view might be advantageous.

Morphisms of Banach bundles

The collection of all Banach bundles can be made into a category by defining appropriate morphisms.

Let π : E → M and π′ : E′ → M′ be two Banach bundles. A Banach bundle morphism from the first bundle to the second consists of a pair of morphisms

For f to be a morphism means simply that f is a continuous map of topological spaces. If the manifolds M and M′ are both of class Cp, then the requirement that f0 be a morphism is the requirement that it be a p-times continuously differentiable function. These two morphisms are required to satisfy two conditions (again, the second one is redundant in the finite-dimensional case):

 the diagram

 commutes, and, for each x ∈ M, the induced map

 is a continuous linear map;

 for each x0 ∈ M there exist trivialising maps

 such that x0 ∈ U, f0(x0) ∈ U′,

 and the map

 is a morphism (a differentiable map of class Cp).

Pull-back of a Banach bundle

One can take a Banach bundle over one manifold and use the pull-back construction to define a new Banach bundle on a second manifold.

Specifically, let π : E → N be a Banach bundle and f : M → N a differentiable map (as usual, everything is Cp). Then the pull-back of π : E → N is the Banach bundle f*π : f*E → M satisfying the following properties:

 for each x ∈ M, (f*E)x = Ef(x);
 there is a commutative diagram

 with the top horizontal map being the identity on each fibre;

 if E is trivial, i.e. equal to N × X for some Banach space X, then f*E is also trivial and equal to M × X, and

 is the projection onto the first coordinate;

 if V is an open subset of N and U = f−1(V), then

 and there is a commutative diagram

 where the maps at the "front" and "back" are the same as those in the previous diagram, and the maps from "back" to "front" are (induced by) the inclusions.

References

 

Banach spaces
Differential geometry
Generalized manifolds
Manifolds
Nonlinear functional analysis
Structures on manifolds
Vector bundles